Melih Okutan (born 1 July 1996) is a Turkish football player who plays for Boluspor on loan from Samsunspor as a winger.

Club career
He made his Süper Lig debut for Fenerbahçe on 19 May 2016 in a game against Sivasspor.

References

External links
 

1996 births
Sportspeople from İzmit
Living people
Turkish footballers
Turkey youth international footballers
Turkey under-21 international footballers
Association football wingers
Fenerbahçe S.K. footballers
Anadolu Üsküdar 1908 footballers
Boluspor footballers
Kayserispor footballers
Samsunspor footballers
Süper Lig players
TFF First League players
TFF Second League players